Fabian Pawela (born 30 November 1985 in Świdnica) is a Polish professional football striker who last played for Olimpia Grudziądz.

External links
 
 panetolikos.gr
 
 

1985 births
Living people
Polish footballers
Atromitos F.C. players
Panetolikos F.C. players
Podbeskidzie Bielsko-Biała players
FC Energie Cottbus players
Ekstraklasa players
Polish expatriate footballers
Expatriate footballers in Greece
Polish expatriate sportspeople in Greece
People from Świdnica
Sportspeople from Lower Silesian Voivodeship
Panegialios F.C. players
3. Liga players
Association football forwards